Sminthurinus henshawi is a species of globular springtail in the family Katiannidae.

References

External links

Collembola
Articles created by Qbugbot
Animals described in 1896